Alaca Dam is a dam in Çorum Province, Turkey, built between 1979 and 1984.

See also
List of dams and reservoirs in Turkey

External links
DSI

Dams in Çorum Province
Dams completed in 1984